This is a list of the 24 members of the European Parliament for Belgium in the 1984 to 1989 session.

List

Notes 

1984
List
Belgium